Frederick Henry Johnson  (15 August 1890 – 26 November 1917) was a British soldier and  recipient of the Victoria Cross, the highest and most prestigious award for gallantry in the face of the enemy that can be awarded to British and Commonwealth forces.

Details
An Old Boy of Whitgift Middle School (Croydon), now Trinity School of John Whitgift, St Dunstan's College (Catford) and Battersea Polytechnic, Johnson was commissioned in 1914 as a Second Lieutenant in the 73rd Field Coy., Corps of Royal Engineers, British Army. He was 25 years old, on 25 September 1915 during the attack on Hill 70 in the Battle of Loos, when he performed an act of bravery for which he was awarded the Victoria Cross.

He later achieved the rank of Major and was killed in action whilst commanding 231st Field Coy. Royal Engineers in Bourlon Wood, France, on 26 November 1917 and is commemorated on the Cambrai Memorial to the Missing.

The medal
Johnson's medal is privately owned.

References

Monuments to Courage (David Harvey, 1999)
The Register of the Victoria Cross (This England, 1997)
The Sapper VCs (Gerald Napier, 1998)
VCs of the First World War - The Western Front 1915 (Peter F. Batchelor & Christopher Matson, 1999)

External links
Royal Engineers Museum Sappers VCs
 

1890 births
1917 deaths
People from Streatham
British World War I recipients of the Victoria Cross
Royal Engineers officers
British military personnel killed in World War I
British Army personnel of World War I
British Army recipients of the Victoria Cross
Military personnel from London